The 2012 FIA WTCC Race of Italy was the opening round of the 2012 World Touring Car Championship season and the eighth running of the FIA WTCC Race of Italy. It was held on 11 March 2012 at the Autodromo Nazionale di Monza in Monza, Italy. Lukoil Racing driver Gabriele Tarquini took pole position for the first race, with Zengő Motorsport's Norbert Michelisz on pole for the second race after the top ten qualifiers were reversed. Both races were won by Yvan Muller for Chevrolet.

Background
Chevrolet and BMW would once again be represented on the grid while SEAT returned with an official customer programme. Ford would also be on the grid courtesy of the independently run Team Aon Ford Focus driven by Tom Chilton and James Nash.

Chevrolet retained their lineup of defending drivers' champion Yvan Muller, Robert Huff and Alain Menu. Darryl O'Young switched from bamboo-engineering to Special Tuning Racing. He was to be joined by Tom Boardman but due to a shortage of the new Oreca built SEAT 1.6T engine his return to the championship was delayed until the Race of Spain. 2011 STCC champion Rickard Rydell returned to the championship for the first round of the season driving a Chevrolet Motorsport Sweden Chevrolet Cruze 1.6T. Gábor Wéber joined Norbert Michelisz at Zengő Motorsport, Alex MacDowall and Pasquale di Sabatino lined up at bamboo-engineering and former Superstars Series driver Alberto Cerqui joined Tom Coronel at ROAL Motorsport. Charles Ng returned to Liqui Moly Team Engstler for a full season having raced for the team at the end of 2011. Andrea Barlesi joined SUNRED Engineering in an old specification SEAT León TDI and Isaac Tutumlu joined Mehdi Bennani at Proteam Racing.

The qualifying format was changed prior to the event, with 12 cars progressing through to Q2 where the top 5 cars would score points. The top ten cars in Q2 would then be reversed to form the race two grid.

Report

Free Practice
Chevrolet cars dominated the free testing session on Thursday; Muller led Huff, Menu, series rookie MacDowall and Rydell at the top of the times while Michelisz was best of the rest in his BMW 320 TC.

Track action resumed on Saturday morning when Huff set the fastest time in the works Chevrolet in Free Practice 1, 0.241 seconds ahead of the Lukoil Racing Team SEAT of Gabriele Tarquini. The session was briefly stopped to clear oil from the track which had caught out Pepe Oriola and Tom Chilton.

It was the turn of Menu to set the fastest time in the second free practice session, setting his fastest time at the beginning of the session and remaining there until the end. Tarquini was second once again with the SEAT producing consistent straight line speed. Although the session was not stopped, yellow flags went out as the SEAT of Barlesi was removed from the gravel trap at the Parabolica.

Qualifying
Tarquini took pole position, the first non-Chevrolet pole since the 2010 Race of Spain, where pole was also taken by Tarquini in a SEAT. Muller would start on the front row but he only made it into Q2 thanks to a tow from his team mates, who lined up behind him on the second row. Q1 had been red flagged with under two minutes remaining as the ROAL Motorsport car of Cerqui ended up in the gravel trap at the Parabolica. The session was restarted but without enough time to complete a timed lap so most of the cars remained in the pits. Twelve cars progressed to Q2 with Oriola taking the independents' trophy pole and Michelisz claiming the reversed grid pole for race two.

Warm-Up
Muller was fastest in the Sunday morning warm up session, that was stopped due to a fire for Special Tuning Racing driver O'Young. He stopped the car and evacuated; the damage was sufficient enough to rule him out of participating in the rest of the weekend.

Race One
Tarquini started from pole but was soon passed by Muller. A mistake by Muller at the end of the lap allowed Tarquini to regain the lead but the positions switched back on lap two. Huff later passed Tarquini for second to seal a Chevrolet 1–2. A first lap collision forced Tiago Monteiro to retire and delayed Stefano D'Aste and Franz Engstler. Rydell ran as high as third during the race but had to settle for fourth at the end, ahead of Coronel and independents' trophy winner Oriola. Menu finished a distant seventh from his team mates and MacDowall was the top rookie with eighth.

Race Two
Michelisz started on the reversed grid pole position and escaped many of the tangles that caught out some of the more experienced drivers behind him. A second lap nudge from Huff approaching the first chicane sent Muller into a spin and caught out Tarquini behind. Muller went through the chicane and across the grass backwards but he recovered without losing much time while Tarquini punctured a tyre and retired. From there, Muller picked off the cars ahead one at a time to catch up with race leader Michelisz. Passing Michelisz proved difficult and at one point, third placed Coronel was able to take second from Muller before losing it again shortly after. Michelisz struck a pigeon on lap seven and Muller passed him later on that lap. Michelisz lost some pace after this and dropped down the order, to fifth by the end of the lap, eventually finishing eighth. Rydell had a bad start and recovered to tenth place to score another point in his one off outing. Muller led a Chevrolet 1–2–3 with Menu second and Huff third; D'Aste was the Yokohama Trophy winner after finishing fifth.

Results

Qualifying

Bold denotes Pole position for second race.

Race 1

Bold denotes Fastest lap.

Race 2

Bold denotes Fastest lap.
Pepe Oriola started from the pitlane.

Standings after the round

Drivers' Championship standings

Yokohama Independents' Trophy standings

Manufacturers' Championship standings

 Note: Only the top five positions are included for both sets of drivers' standings.

References

Results Booklet PDF at FIAWTCC.com

Italy
FIA WTCC Race of Italy